The Family 0 is a family of inline piston engines that was developed by Opel, at the time a subsidiary of General Motors, as a low-displacement engine for use on entry-level subcompact cars from Opel/Vauxhall.

These engines feature a light-weight cast-iron semi-closed deck engine block with an aluminum cylinder head. The valvetrain consists of chain-driven hollowcast dual overhead camshafts (DOHC) that actuate 4-valves per cylinder via roller finger followers with hydraulic tappets. These engines also feature a  bore spacing and fracture-split connecting rods.

Later versions also incorporate a variable length intake manifold (VLIM) and variable valve timing (VVT).

Originally debuting as either a  straight-3 or  straight-4; a  I4 variant was added with the introduction of the second generation, replacing the 1.4 L Family 1 engine. The Family 0 engines were produced by Opel Wien in Vienna/Aspern (Austria), by GM in Bupyeong (Korea) and Flint (Michigan, USA).

Generation I 

The engine was first introduced in the 1996 Opel Corsa, either as a three-cylinder or as a four-cylinder version. This was Opel's first three-cylinder engine.

Applications:

 2000-2004 Opel/Vauxhall Agila
 1998-2003 Opel/Vauxhall Astra G
 1996-2000 Opel/Vauxhall Corsa B
 2000-2004 Opel/Vauxhall Corsa C

Generation II
The second generation Family 0 began production in November 2002. It is an updated version of the Family 0 engine and features TwinPort technology – twin intake ports with a choke closing one of the ports at low RPM, providing strong air swirl pattern for higher torque levels and better fuel economy. The crankshaft and oil galleries were also redesigned to lower power loss; thereby increasing fuel economy.

Applications:
 2003-2010 Opel/Vauxhall Combo C
 2003-2006 Opel/Vauxhall Corsa C/Holden Barina (XC)
 2006-2014 Opel/Vauxhall Corsa D
 2004-2009 Opel/Vauxhall Tigra TwinTop
 2004-2010 Opel/Vauxhall Astra H
 2005-2009 Opel/Vauxhall Astra G Classic models
 2003-2007 Opel/Vauxhall Agila
 2004-2010 Opel/Vauxhall Meriva A

Generation III 
The EcoFlex engine is a version of the TwinPort tuned to provide better fuel economy and lower emissions. The 1.4 L engine was introduced in 2008 and the 1.0 L engine in 2010. For model year 2012, the EcoFlex engines have been updated with double cam phasing (DCVCP) in a Gen III block.

Certain Opel and US-market Chevrolet versions of the Delta II platform compact cars use a turbocharged version of the 1.4 L engine with double variable cam phasing (DCVCP); in the future, an optional gasoline direct injection system will be introduced. 
Opel versions feature Start&Stop system from 2011 and a Gen III block; a lower-power 120 ps version has been introduced as well. For model year 2013, the overboost to  has been added.

Applications:
2011–2019 Opel/Vauxhall Corsa
2009–2015 Opel/Vauxhall Astra J
2010–2017 Opel/Vauxhall Meriva B
2011–2019 Opel/Vauxhall Zafira Tourer
2011–2015 Chevrolet Cruze
2016 Chevrolet Cruze Limited
2010–2015 Chevrolet Volt / Opel/Vauxhall Ampera
2012–2020 Chevrolet Aveo/Sonic
2013–2019 Opel Adam
2013–2016 Cadillac ELR
2013–present Buick Encore / Opel Mokka
2014-present Chevrolet/Holden Trax
2017–2019 Vanderhall Venice
2016- Roewe e950
2013-2015 Chevrolet Spin

See also
Family II engine
Family 1 engine
GM small gasoline engine, their successor
List of GM engines

References

External links

 http://www.gmpowertrain.com

Family 0
Straight-three engines
Straight-four engines
Gasoline engines by model